Jakub Kosecki (born August 29, 1990) is a Polish professional footballer who plays as a winger for Weszło Warsaw.

Career
Having been around the world in various youth teams as a child, in March 2009, Kosecki moved to Legia Warsaw. 

He was loaned out several times at Legia; in July 2010, he was loaned to ŁKS Łódź, and returned to Legia one year later; in 2012 he was loaned to Lechia Gdańsk and in 2015, Kosecki was loaned to SV Sandhausen. 

After a successful loan spell, on 6 August 2016, he joined Sandhausen permanently on a two-year contract. He returned to Poland when on 22 June 2017 he signed a contract with Śląsk Wrocław.

On 24 July 2018 he signed a contract with Turkish side Adana Demirspor, where he reached the promotion play-off finals, with the team losing out to Hatayspor, although he missed the finals themselves due to injury. After only 6 appearances in the 2020-21 season he left in February 2021 after terminating his contract by mutual consent. In February 2021, he signed a deal with the Polish Ekstraklasa side Cracovia.

On 1 February 2022, he signed a contract with II liga club Motor Lublin until the end of the 2021–22 season, with an option to extend for another season.

On 11 July 2022, Kosecki joined V liga side Weszło Warsaw.

Personal life 
He is the son of former Poland international Roman Kosecki.

Career statistics

Club

International goals
Scores and results list Kosecki's goal tally.

Honours
Legia Warsaw:
 Ekstraklasa: 2012–13, 2013–14
 Polish Cup: 2011–12, 2012–13, 2014–15

References

External links
  
 
 

1990 births
Living people
Footballers from Warsaw
Polish footballers
Poland international footballers
Poland under-21 international footballers
Association football midfielders
Legia Warsaw players
ŁKS Łódź players
Lechia Gdańsk players
SV Sandhausen players
Śląsk Wrocław players
Adana Demirspor footballers
MKS Cracovia (football) players
Motor Lublin players
KTS Weszło Warsaw players
Ekstraklasa players
II liga players
2. Bundesliga players
TFF First League players
Polish expatriate footballers
Polish expatriate sportspeople in France
Expatriate footballers in France
Polish expatriate sportspeople in the United States
Expatriate soccer players in the United States
Polish expatriate sportspeople in Germany
Expatriate footballers in Germany
Polish expatriate sportspeople in Turkey
Expatriate footballers in Turkey